The Cessna 414 is an American light, pressurized, twin-engine transport aircraft built by Cessna. It first flew in 1968 and an improved variant was introduced from 1978 as the 414A Chancellor.

Design and development
The pressurized 414 was developed to appeal to owners of unpressurized, twin-engined aircraft, and was based on the fuselage of the Cessna 421 and used the wing design of the Cessna 401. The 414 is a low-wing cantilever monoplane with a conventional tail unit and a retractable tricycle landing gear. It is powered by two wing-mounted 310 hp (231 kW) Continental TSIO-520-J horizontally opposed, six-cylinder engines. The prototype, registered N7170C, first flew on 1 November 1968, and production aircraft were available in a number of optional seating arrangements and avionics packages. The name Chancellor was used for models marketed from 1976.  An improved variant the Cessna 414A Chancellor was introduced in 1978 with the major change being a redesigned and increased-span wing with integral fuel tanks and an extended nose to give more baggage space.

Modifications
Many supplemental type certificates exist for the aircraft that allow upgrades to improve performance. Common are engine and aerodynamic modifications, including winglets.

In 1974, American Jet Industries built a turboprop-powered conversion of the Cessna 414, named the Turbo Star Pressurized 414, using Allison 250-B17B engines. Scenic Airlines of Las Vegas purchased the rights to the design in 1977.

Thielert has offered engine conversions using their Centurion Engines. This involves the installation of FADEC-controlled aviation diesel piston engines that run on commonly available jet fuel. Thielert claims increased power and improved fuel economy over other available conventional piston engines.

Variants

414
Initial production variant, 516 built
414A Chancellor
Improved 414 with narrower vertical tail, longer span bonded wet wing without tip tanks, a lengthened nose, redesigned landing gear, and powered by two 310 hp (231kW) TSIO-520-N engines, 554 built.
Riley Rocket 414
Conversion of Cessna 414 aircraft by fitting two 400 hp Lycoming IO-720 engines

Operators

Military operators

Accidents and incidents
American gospel singer Keith Green and 11 other people were killed on July 28, 1982, in a Cessna 414 shortly after takeoff at the private Garden Valley Airport, near Garden Valley, Texas. The NTSB report indicates that the probable cause of the crash was a combination of the aircraft being overloaded (the occupants were four adults and eight children, while the aircraft has only seven seats) and pilot's failure to calculate weight and balance relative to the aircraft's design parameters.

Specifications (414A Chancellor)

References

Further reading

External links

Cessna 421 & 414 photo

414
1960s United States business aircraft
Low-wing aircraft
Aircraft first flown in 1968
Twin piston-engined tractor aircraft